Robert S. Woodruff was an American football, basketball, and baseball coach. He served as the head football coach at Wheaton College in Wheaton, Illinois for one season, in 1921, compiling a record of 6–2.

References 

Year of death missing
Year of birth missing
Wheaton Thunder baseball coaches
Wheaton Thunder football coaches
Wheaton Thunder men's basketball coaches